The following is a list of Olympic medalists born in the state of Michigan, United States.

Olympic medalists
Michigan
Michigan
Sports in Michigan